In mathematics, the binary cyclic group of the n-gon is the cyclic group of order 2n, thought of as an extension of the cyclic group  by a cyclic group of order 2. Coxeter writes the binary cyclic group with angle-brackets, ⟨n⟩, and the index 2 subgroup as (n) or [n]+.

It is the binary polyhedral group corresponding to the cyclic group.

In terms of binary polyhedral groups, the binary cyclic group is the preimage of the cyclic group of rotations under the 2:1 covering homomorphism

of the special orthogonal group by the spin group.

As a subgroup of the spin group, the binary cyclic group can be described concretely as a discrete subgroup of the unit quaternions, under the isomorphism  where Sp(1) is the multiplicative group of unit quaternions. (For a description of this homomorphism see the article on quaternions and spatial rotations.)

Presentation 
The binary cyclic group can be defined as:

See also
binary dihedral group, ⟨2,2,n⟩, order 4n
binary tetrahedral group, ⟨2,3,3⟩, order 24
binary octahedral group, ⟨2,3,4⟩, order 48
binary icosahedral group, ⟨2,3,5⟩, order 120

References

Cyclic